Qeshlaq-e Abbasabad (also Romanized as Qeshlāq-e ‘Abbāsābād; also known as ‘Abbāsābād and ‘Abbāsābād-e Chīcheklū) is a village in Khondab Rural District, in the Central District of Khondab County, Markazi Province, Iran. At the 2006 census, its population was 86, in 22 families.

References 

Populated places in Khondab County